Selinus or Selinous was a port-town on the west coast of ancient Cilicia and later of Isauria, at the mouth of a small river of the same name, now called Musa Çay. It is located west of the modern city of Gazipaşa in Turkey.

History

Selinus is memorable in history as the place in which Emperor Trajan is said by some authors to have died in 117 AD. After that event, the place for a time bore the name of Trajanopolis or Traianopolis (Τραϊανούπολις), but its bishops afterwards are called bishops of Selinus. Basil of Seleucia describes the place as reduced to a state of insignificance in his time though it had once been a great commercial town.

The site

Selinus was situated on a precipitous rock, surrounded on almost every side by the sea, by which position it was rendered almost impregnable. The whole of the rock, however, was not included in the ancient line of fortifications. Inside the walls there still are many traces of houses, but on the outside and between the foot of the hill and the river, the remains of some large buildings are yet standing, which appear to be a mausoleum, an agora, a theatre, an aqueduct and some tombs. No longer a residential bishopric, it remains a titular see of the Roman Catholic Church.

References

Populated places in ancient Cilicia
Populated places in ancient Isauria
Former populated places in Turkey
Roman towns and cities in Turkey
Populated places of the Byzantine Empire
History of Antalya Province
Catholic titular sees in Asia
Hellenistic colonies in Anatolia
Archaeological sites in Turkey
Gazipaşa District